East Juniata Junior/Senior High School is a diminutive, rural, combined middle school and high school. It is one of two secondary campuses in the Juniata County School District. The school is located along Route 35 in Fayette Township. In the 2016–2017 school year, the school reported an enrollment of 514 pupils in grades 7th through 12th.

Extracurriculars
The Juniata County School District offers a wide variety of clubs, activities and sports at East Juniata Junior Senior High School.

Athletics
The following athletics are available at East Juniata. EJ participates in PIAA District IV and is part of the Tri-Valley League:
 Baseball
 Soccer
 Basketball
 Field Hockey
 Football
 Golf
 Softball
 Track and Field
 Wrestling

References

Public high schools in Pennsylvania
Public middle schools in Pennsylvania
Schools in Juniata County, Pennsylvania